Patla may refer to

Places
Patla, Kasaragod, a village in Kasaragod district, Kerala, India
Patla railway station, Pakistan
Patla, Puebla, a village in Puebla, Mexico; see Upper Necaxa Totonac
Patla, a village in Puebla, Mexico; see Necaxa River

People
 (1898-1977), Polish miner, geologist, World War II resistance fighter  
Angela Patla, Miss Pennsylvania USA, 2000
 (1898-1977), Polish journalist , museologist , teacher, World War II resistance fighter  
Genowefa Patla (born 1962), Polish javelin thrower

See also

Patala (disambiguation)